Present Montenegrin car plates have black characters on a rectangular white background, with blue strip on the left. The plates follow the 520 mm x 110 mm format, except for motorcycles. The present licence plates format was introduced on 6 June 2008, and replaced the old format (format of Yugoslav licence plates) gradually over the following year. The new format is on par with common European Union format.

Overview
The plate is in following layout: to the left, a blue-colored field contains Montenegro's international automobile code (MNE); continuing in white background, the two-letter code of the municipality where the vehicle was registered in, then the coat-of-arms of Montenegro following by the registration code, which generally consists of two letters followed by three numbers. However, with an additional payment, it is possible to obtain the customized plates with any letter-number combination. 
Letters I and O are omitted in serial combinations because of the similarity with the numbers 1 and 0, but they can be used on a customized plate amongst other letters which are omitted: W, X, Y, Q and Serbo-Croatian Latin Alphabet letters (Č,Ć,Š,Đ,Ž).

Police vehicles have plates with blue letters, while military vehicles have plates with green letters. The diplomatic corps cars have separate format licence plates, with no municipality code, coat of arms, and with yellow code on white background. The plates used on bigger trucks and other vehicles that can be oversized for some of the smaller roads are red with white characters. 

Unlike the older licence plates, which were inherited from SFRY-era, and slightly changed in 1998, the new licence plates have a separate area code for every municipality in Montenegro. The municipalities that were previously absent were Andrijevica, Danilovgrad, Kolašin, Mojkovac, Plav, Plužine, Rožaje, Šavnik, Tivat and Žabljak.

Municipal codes

These are the Montenegrin car license plate codes by municipality and in alphabetical order:

Special types

Diplomatic license plates 

Vehicles operated by foreign embassies, consulates, consular and diplomatic staff and various international organizations have been given plates with a distinguishing format of two (or three) numbers, one letter, three numbers, e.g., 12(3)–X–456. Vehicle owned by a diplomat, by accredited non-diplomatic staff or by a consular carries a plate with characters printed in yellow on a white background while the vehicle owned by a foreign press agency, a foreign cultural representative or by an office of a foreign company and/or its staff, has plates with characters printed in black on a white background, as normal ones.
The first group of two/three numbers (123) identifies the country or organization to which the plate has been issued, the second group of three numbers (456) is a serial number. The letter in the middle (X) is denoting the status of the owner.

List of codes by country (not complete):

Agriculture plates 

Montenegro also has agriculture plates. These plates are used by agriculture machines like tractors etc. The plates consist of two-letter code of the municipality where the vehicle is registered, then the coat-of-arms of Montenegro followed by two serial letters and two serial numbers on the lower side. The characters are printed in white on a light-green background.

Government codes 
These plate formats are very similar to civilian plates.

P – Police
V – Military

Temporary plates 
Temporary license plates show after the coat of arms the letters RP over each other as well as a two digit representing year number. The sign concludes with three digits. Temporary plates are used among other possible uses for vehicle owned by temporary residents.

Specific serial combinations 

In Podgorica amongst normal serial combinations exist two more which are used for two urban municipalities. One of them is Tuzi/Malesia located eastern of Podgorica and uses combination PG Tx123 (e.g. PG TD123). The other one is Golubovci/Zeta located south of Podgorica and uses combination PG Gx123 (e.g. PG GD123). Trailers registered in one of these urban municipalities also have specific combinations e.g. PG 123TA. 
Also, there exist two other combinations like PG MN123 and PG CG123. MN stands for Montenegro and CG also for Montenegro but on Montenegrin language (Crna Gora). These two combinations are only used by state authorities and Montenegrin administrations.

Another common practice is special second letter pair for taxi service cars, regional independent. Like PG TX123 or KO TX456.

References

External links
Licence plates in Montenegro

Montenegro
Transport in Montenegro
Montenegro transport-related lists